Robert W. Miller (June 1868 – May 23, 1931) was a pitcher in Major League Baseball who played from 1890 through 1891 for the Rochester Broncos and Washington Statesmen of the American Association.

External links
Baseball Reference
Retrosheet

Major League Baseball pitchers
Rochester Broncos players
Washington Statesmen players
Baseball players from Newark, New Jersey
1868 births
1931 deaths
Date of birth missing
Newark Little Giants players
Newark Trunkmakers players
Troy Trojans (minor league) players
Springfield Ponies players
Springfield Maroons players
Scranton Coal Heavers players
Newark Colts players
19th-century baseball players